Lebanon National Cemetery is a United States National Cemetery located just outside the city of Lebanon in Marion County, Kentucky.  Administered by the United States Department of Veterans Affairs, it encompasses  and as of the end of 2005 it had 4,699 interments. It is administered by the Zachary Taylor National Cemetery.

History
First established in 1862 as a cemetery for nearby Camp Crittenden, the Union supply depot in Lebanon, and the military hospitals in the area. It was designated a National Cemetery in 1867. Two donations of land in the 1980s expanded the cemetery to its current size.

A  portion of the cemetery was listed on the National Register of Historic Places in 1975, as Lebanon National Cemetery.

Numerous Union soldiers who died in the Battle of Perryville are interred there.

References

External links
 National Cemetery Administration
 Lebanon National Cemetery
 
 
 

1863 establishments in Kentucky
Cemeteries on the National Register of Historic Places in Kentucky
National Register of Historic Places in Marion County, Kentucky
United States national cemeteries
Protected areas of Marion County, Kentucky
Historic American Landscapes Survey in Kentucky